Sipdroid is a voice over IP mobile app for the Android operating system using the Session Initiation Protocol.

Sipdroid is free and open source software released under the GPL-3.0-or-later license.

History 

The sipdroid open source project was started in svn on March 12, 2009 by the project author pmerle71. It reached version 1.0 on July 12 of the same year. More recent major releases are: 1.5 (May 29, 2010) with improved video quality, 2.0 (November 18, 2010) with the ability to link to a google voice account, 2.2 (March 25, 2011) with the ability to send video sms messages, 2.7 (May 21, 2012) with improved low-latency capability, and 3.0 (April 22, 2013) with support for TLS.

In 2010-2011 it gained popularity partially because of its ability to work with Google's Google Voice service, making calls to traditional telephone numbers while only using the data network. However, after Google Voice removed the ability to connect over SIP on March 8, 2011 this functionality was no longer available.

Since this time, sipdroid has been used with many different native SIP deployments and is given as the default android SIP client by some vendors.

As of January 5, 2014, it is listed on the google play store as having 1,000,000-5,000,000 installations  and has been reviewed by nearly 10,000 people.

Fork 

Lumicall is a fork of Sipdroid by Daniel Pocock that has undergone significant extensions, adding support for encryption (Transport Layer Security, SRTP, ZRTP), Push-to-talk, ENUM dialing and other enhancements.

First released on 5 February 2012, Lumicall is distributed via Google Play and F-droid.

In 2012, Lumicall's real-time monitoring service, based on gmetric4j, was featured in the book Monitoring with Ganglia.  Lumicall was featured in the main track at FOSDEM 2013 during the event Free, Open, Secure and Convenient Communications where the lead developer, Daniel Pocock, was part of a panel discussion on this pressing topic for the free software community.

Lumicall supports Interactive Connectivity Establishment, the IETF proposed successor to STUN for users behind NAT.

Lumicall interfaces with Android's default dialer application and optionally prompts the user to make an outgoing call using VoIP or the GSM/3G network.

Features 

 Two SIP accounts can be used simultaneously
 Supports STUN for users behind Network address translation (NAT)
 Video calls (limited support)

Sipdroid interfaces with Android's default dialer application and optionally prompts the user to make an outgoing call using Sipdroid or the GSM/3G network.

See also 

 Comparison of VoIP software
 List of SIP software
 Mobile VoIP

References

External links 

 
 Lumicall at Google Play
 OpenTelecoms (general information about federated VoIP and building infrastructure for Lumicall users)

Free and open-source Android software
Free VoIP software